Mahalia Belo is an English film and television director.

Biography
Belo graduated from the National Film and Television School in 2012. Her graduation film, Volume won a BIFA award in the Best British Short Film category and was shown at the Sundance Film Festival and the BFI London Film Festival.

She won a 2017 British Academy Television Craft Award in the best breakthrough talent category for her work directing the television drama Ellen.

She directed psychological thriller Requiem and the TV adaption of Andrea Levy's novel about the last days of slavery in Jamaica, The Long Song, both of which were broadcast in 2018. Bello will direct The End We Start From, starring Jodie Comer and Benedict Cumberbatch.

References

External links

Living people
British television directors
British women film directors
Alumni of the National Film and Television School
Year of birth missing (living people)
British women television directors